Noel Street is a tram stop on Nottingham Express Transit (NET), in the city of Nottingham suburb of Hyson Green. The tram stop opened on 9 March 2004, along with NET's initial system. It is located on a one way section of the tramway, and is served only by northbound trams; the nearest southbound stop is the Hyson Green Market tram stop. The tram stop is located on a contra-flow reserved track alongside Noel Street, which is at this point one way southbound, and has a single side platform flanking the single track.

With the opening of NET's phase two, Noel Street is now on the common section of the NET, where line 1, between Hucknall and Chilwell, and line 2, between Phoenix Park and Clifton, operate together. Trams on each line run at frequencies that vary between 4 and 8 trams per hour, depending on the day and time of day, combining to provide up to 16 trams per hour on the common section.

References

External links

Nottingham Express Transit stops
Railway stations in Great Britain opened in 2004